This is a list of characters appearing in the Showtime drama television series Homeland.

Appearances
  = Main cast (credited) 
  = Recurring cast (3+)
  = Guest cast (1-2)

Main cast

Recurring cast 

Notes

Main characters
The following is a list of series regulars who have appeared in one or more of the series' eight seasons. The characters are listed in the order they were first credited in the series.

Carrie Mathison

Played by Claire Danes, Carrie Mathison is a CIA officer who grapples with bipolar disorder. While deployed in Iraq, Carrie receives information leading her to suspect rescued American POW Nicholas Brody of being a terrorist. During a lengthy unauthorized investigation into Brody, she becomes obsessed with him, and the two even have a brief romantic relationship. Her suspicions ultimately being correct, she loses her job when her investigation is exposed by Brody. Carrie successfully stops Brody's suicide bombing attempt but is unaware she was successful and is instead made to believe that Brody was innocent. Now completely demoralized, she submits herself to electroconvulsive therapy as she is no longer confident in her skills.

When Brody's confession video is discovered, Carrie is brought back into the CIA. She successfully interrogates Brody, getting him to admit his complicity and to agree to work against al-Qaeda rather than be exposed to the world as treasonous. Carrie acts as Brody's handler and their romance is eventually rekindled. She is kidnapped by Abu Nazir on American soil but is instrumental in his subsequent capture and killing by FBI forces. When Brody is framed by al-Qaeda as the perpetrator of the Langley bombing on 12/12, Carrie helps Brody flee the country and promises to clear his name.

After learning that the Iranians were responsible for the bombing, Carrie and Saul hatch an elaborate plan to draw out IRGC Deputy Chief Majid Javadi, publicly staging the CIA's apparent disavowal of Carrie in order to convince the Iranians she can be turned. As part of the ruse, Carrie is placed in a psych ward, which takes a mental and emotional toll on her despite the false pretenses of her stay. The plan is ultimately a success when Javadi comes to the U.S. and is turned into the CIA's asset in Iran. Saul brings Brody back to the U.S. so that he can enact the second stage of the plan: assassinate the IRGC chief in Tehran so that he can be replaced with Javadi. Carrie convinces Brody to take up the mission, and helps him escape to a safehouse after he completes the plan. While waiting to be extracted, Carrie reveals to Brody she is pregnant with his child. Brody is ultimately captured and executed by the Iranian authorities, and Carrie attends his public hanging.

Months later, Carrie is the CIA's station chief in Kabul, and has left her daughter Frannie with her sister Maggie, reluctant to be a mother. As station chief, she earns the nickname "The Drone Queen" for overseeing numerous airstrikes. Carrie transfers over to the Islamabad station after its previous chief is killed, and leads the hunt for Taliban leader Haissam Haqqani. After Haqqani storms the U.S. embassy and takes control of the region, Carrie returns home to arrange her father's funeral, and reunites with her estranged mother. She quits the CIA after learning that Saul agreed to Dar Adal's covert deal with Haqqani in hopes of becoming CIA director.

Two years later, Carrie lives in Berlin, working as a security consultant for the During Foundation and staying with her daughter Frannie as well as her coworker and boyfriend Jonas. After evading an assassination attempt, Carrie goes into hiding and discovers that the Russians have infiltrated the CIA's Berlin station. She is forced to divert her attention from the plot in order to rescue Peter Quinn from a jihadist compound where he was subjected to a sarin gas attack. She and Saul wake Quinn from his coma in an attempt to learn the jihadists' plot, but it is unsuccessful and results in Quinn suffering a major stroke. Carrie ultimately stops the terrorist attack, but declines to rejoin the CIA.

Months later, Carrie moves to New York, where she works at a nonprofit providing legal aid to Muslim Americans, while covertly acting as President-elect Elizabeth Keane's foreign policy advisor. She also takes care of a recovering Quinn, feeling immense guilt over her role in causing his stroke. Carrie loses custody of Frannie after child services deem Carrie an imminent risk to her daughter. She learns that it was engineered by Dar Adal, whose black ops group is discovered by Quinn to be brewing a plot against the President-elect. Quinn dies saving Carrie and Keane from an assassination attempt. Weeks later, Carrie regains custody of her daughter and works as an intelligence advisor to the White House, but is abruptly fired amidst President Keane's mass roundup of federal employees in retaliation to the assassination attempt.

Over the next three months, Carrie begins seeking justice against the President, but soon learns with Saul's help that the Russians are engineering an elaborate attempt to undermine the White House. After Carrie repeatedly endangers Frannie during her investigation, she agrees to give up custody of her daughter to Maggie. She and Saul then travel to Russia to exfiltrate a key witness back to the U.S. Carrie lures Russian authorities led by Yevgeny Gromov away from Saul's team, resulting in her capture and imprisonment. Seven months later, Saul negotiates her release. Carrie emerges in severe delirium, having been denied her medication during her captivity.

Carrie recovers from her captivity at a hospital in Germany, unable to remember most of the time she spent in Russia. Saul soon calls her back to Kabul to help negotiate a peace agreement that would end the war in Afghanistan. The plan nearly succeeds until the American and Afghan presidents die in a helicopter crash. With tensions between U.S. and Pakistani governments nearly escalating to a war, Carrie works with Yevgeny to recover the helicopter's flight recorder. Upon finding it, the two learn that the helicopter crashed due to a mechanical failure, which if publicized would avert the impending war. However, Yevgeny confiscates the recorder and agrees to exchange it for the identity of Saul's deeply embedded asset inside the Kremlin. Carrie identifies the asset, successfully preventing a war, though Carrie is forced to escape to Russia with Yevgeny. Two years later, Carrie lives with Yevgeny in Moscow, having defected, while secretly operating as Saul's new Russian asset.

Nicholas Brody

Played by Damian Lewis, Nicholas Brody is the husband of Jessica Brody and father to Dana and Chris. He is an ex-Marine who was captured by al-Qaeda and held as a POW for eight years in Iraq. Brody, after years of brutal treatment, becomes sympathetic to Abu Nazir's cause during his captivity and agrees to return to the United States as a sleeper agent.  Once back in the U.S., Brody has a turbulent relationship with his family, partly due to Jessica's having had an affair with Brody's best friend Mike. Brody has an affair of his own with Carrie Mathison, the CIA officer who suspects him of working for al-Qaeda. According to plan, Brody successfully gets himself into a bunker with the Vice President while wearing a suicide vest, intending to detonate it, but he aborts when Dana calls him, begging him to come home. He leaves the scene with nobody being the wiser.

Brody takes advantage of his public popularity, and support from Vice President Walden, to win a seat in the United States House of Representatives. He continues to secretly work for Abu Nazir until he is discovered by the CIA. Carrie, using her emotional connection with Brody, is able to convince him to turn against al-Qaeda. Using Brody's inside information, a major al-Qaeda terrorist attack is thwarted by the CIA. However, Brody is made to look like the perpetrator of a second bombing at CIA Headquarters on 12/12, making him the most wanted man in America. Carrie helps him escape and go into hiding in Canada while promising to clear his name.

Months later, an injured Brody resurfaces in Caracas, where a group of mercenaries with CIA connections tend to his wounds and keep him addicted to heroin in a slum that grew out of an abandoned skyscraper. Saul arrives weeks later with $10 million in cash for Brody's release, finding him in a catatonic state. After Brody recovers from his withdrawal symptoms, Saul and Carrie convince him to lead an operation in Tehran to assassinate IRGC chief Danesh Akbari, so that he can be replaced with Deputy Chief Majid Javadi (who Saul has turned into a CIA asset). Before Brody departs, Carrie allows him a last farewell with Dana, who rebuffs him and asks to never see him again. In Tehran, Brody successfully assassinates Akbari; Carrie helps him escape to a CIA safehouse and reveals that she is pregnant with his child. Brody is soon arrested by Iranian authorities, who sentence him to death by public hanging. Carrie attends Brody's execution despite his pleas that she not be there.

Saul Berenson
Played by Mandy Patinkin, Saul Berenson is a veteran intelligence officer at the CIA, initially introduced as the agency's Middle East Division Chief. Saul recruited a young Carrie Mathison into the CIA, and is a close friend and mentor to her. His measured approach to his job often clashes with Carrie's drastic, impulsive methods. Saul is doggedly committed to his job, often at the expense of his personal life: he has a wife, Mira, who resents his absence at home (which ultimately results in their divorce), and a sister, Dorit, who lives in the West Bank and has not seen him in years.

Carrie told Saul about the intel Hasan Ibrahim supplied regarding a turned American POW and requested permission to place surveillance on Sgt. Nick Brody, a POW who was recently rescued after long captivity. Saul denied the request, suggesting that her idea that Abu Nazir tipped off the military to the location where Brody was found was fanciful, and would need real evidence to justify action against Brody. He did however place her in Brody's debriefing on the condition that she behave herself (which she didn't). Saul defends her against her boss, David Estes, who complained about her behavior in the debriefing, however he was warned not to let things get personal with Carrie. Saul discovered Carrie's illegal surveillance of Brody and became angry with her when she later to seduce Brody. Saul does feel that Carrie justified herself when she found a rhythmic pattern in the way Brody tapped his fingers during televised appearances.

Saul is instrumental in getting cooperation from captured terrorist Aileen Morgan, which leads to information that implicates Tom Walker. When she also wonders aloud why Brody betrayed her by turning her in, leading Saul to realize that Carrie really loves Brody. Saul later runs afoul of CIA Director Estes when he discovers that Estes and then-CIA director William Walden ordered a drone strike that hit a school in Iraq and have been taking measures to cover up the incident. After an operation with Carrie in Beirut, Saul finds a copy of the confession tape that Brody recorded.  This leads to Saul, Carrie, and Estes forming a task force attempting to use Brody as a re-doubled agent against al-Qaeda. Saul discovers that Estes' plan is to have Brody killed once the operation is finished and tries to put a stop to it which leads to further friction with Estes, almost losing his job. However, Peter Quinn, the black ops operative hired by Estes to kill Brody, decides not to go through with the plan once Abu Nazir is killed. When Estes is killed at the bombing of the memorial service for William Walden at Langley on December 12, Saul becomes the acting director of the CIA.

Once he is director, Saul and Carrie almost immediately put into action a plan to lure out the mastermind behind the 12/12 attacks, in which Carrie is outed to the press as having bipolar disorder and having had an affair with Brody. Appearing vulnerable, Carrie is contacted by representatives of an international bank with ties to the middle east, as Saul predicted, who ask her to inform on CIA operations to their client, Majid Javadi, Iran's deputy intelligence Chief and the orchestrator of the 12/12 attack with whom Saul has a troubled history. When they were both getting their starts in their respective nations, Saul and Javadi worked together during the Iranian hostage crisis, but Javadi betrayed Saul by having several hostages who Saul was going to extradite back to the states killed. In response, Saul helped Javadi's wife and son escape to America. Saul, with the help of Fara Sherazi, finds that Javadi embezzled millions from his own nation to fund the attack, making him an enemy of the Iranian state should this ever be revealed. Using this as leverage to make Javadi a CIA asset, Saul sends Javadi back to Iran. At the same time, Saul clashes with Senator Andrew Lockhart, who is soon to replace him as director, and he discovers that his wife is having an affair with a man named Alain Bernard.

Saul manages to bring Brody, now a heroin addict after his captivity in Caracas, back to the United States to help carry out the second phase of his plans for the Middle East. Saul intends to send Brody to Iran under the guise of seeking political asylum so that he can kill Danesh Akbari, leader of the Revolutionary Guard, who will then be replaced by Javadi - ushering in a regime change in the nation. A special ops unit works to rehabilitate and retrain Brody back to peak condition. Meanwhile, Saul finds that Alain is an Israeli intelligence agent hired by Lockhart to spy on him, and uses this info to give himself more time in office to see through the mission to the plan. Brody manages to make it into Tehran, where he eventually succeeds in killing Akbari. Carrie implores Saul to get Brody extracted; Saul agrees, but Lockhart and Dar Adal overstep him and leak Brody's location to Iranian authorities, who apprehend and execute Brody. Despite this, Saul's plan is a success, with Iran agreeing to disarm its nuclear sites four months later. Saul is fired from the CIA once Lockhart takes office, and then begins work in the private sector.

Saul travels to the U.S. embassy in Islamabad where Carrie has since been posted as station chief, and reconnects with U.S. ambassador Martha Boyd, an old friend and former romantic partner. On his way back, Saul is kidnapped and brought to Taliban leader Haissam Haqqani, who uses him as a human shield to travel freely through Pakistan without fear of a drone strike. Haqqani holds Saul captive as a bargaining chip to get several Taliban prisoners released in an exchange. Some time after the Taliban's assault on the U.S. embassy, Saul learns from Dar Adal that Haqqani agreed not to harbor terrorists in Afghanistan in exchange for being removed from the CIA's kill list. Dar also informs Saul that video evidence of his capture by the Taliban will not be publicized, preserving Saul's chances of becoming CIA director. Saul agrees to this deal, deeply disappointing Carrie when eventually finds out. Carrie subsequently helps derail Saul's bid for the directorship, forming a rift between them that lasts over two years.

Two years later, Saul is called to Berlin to attend to a scandal involving leaked documents attesting to widespread privacy violations by the American and German governments as part of a counterterrorism probe. Saul formally agrees to end the program but continues it independently, enlisting Peter Quinn to assassinate known targets. In the two-year interim, Mira filed for divorce from Saul after he rejoined the CIA, and Saul began a sexual relationship with Berlin station chief Allison Carr. Carrie later finds out that Allison is a longtime mole for the Russians and is using Saul as a patsy to obtain classified intelligence. Carrie and Saul team up with German intelligence to thwart the Russians' operation; though Allison escapes, Saul makes a deal with Ivan Krupin, her handler, for details about her extraction plan, and leads a team to intercept and assassinate Allison at the German border.

Months later, Saul and Dar Adal advise President-elect Elizabeth Keane in New York during her transition into office. Dar, distrustful of Keane's antiwar platform and anticipated overhauls of the intelligence community, plots behind Saul's back to undermine the Keane administration. Saul investigates Iran's possible violations of their nuclear treaty (based on a false lead planted by Dar), visiting his sister Dorit in the West Bank as cover to secretly meet with Majid Javadi. Saul has Javadi confirm whether Iran is running a parallel nuclear program; Javadi eventually comes to the U.S. himself, seeking political asylum after he is outed as a CIA asset in Iran, and confirms to Saul that Iran is complying with the nuclear pact. However, Javadi reverses course, telling the opposite to Keane after making a deal with Dar Adal. Saul and Carrie prove to Keane that Dar is conspiring against her. After a faction within Dar's group attempts to assassinate Keane, she retaliates during the first month of her presidency by arresting over 200 federal employees including Saul.

Some months later, Keane agrees to release her 200 political prisoners including Saul, who accepts the position of National Security Advisor. Saul is first placed in charge of the manhunt for provocateur Brett O'Keefe, and unsuccessfully attempts to deescalate a standoff between the FBI and O'Keefe's supporters (which ultimately ends in a deadly shootout). Saul finds evidence that the situation escalated due to disinformation deployed by the Russians, and enlists a task force to uncover a widespread Russian conspiracy to undermine President Keane's administration. He and Carrie work to exfiltrate a key witness in the case from Russia so that she can testify about the conspiracy before Congress. Carrie allows herself to be captured by the GRU in order to ensure the operation's success, and Saul is forced to leave her behind. Seven months later, Saul negotiates Carrie's release in a prisoner exchange and finds her in severe delirium due to her being denied medication for her bipolar disorder while in captivity.

After Keane resigns, Saul stays on as National Security Advisor for Ralph Warner, who inherits the office after serving as vice president to Keane. Over a period of months, Saul oversees a diplomatic effort to end the war in Afghanistan. He visits a recovering Carrie in Germany and enlists her to help negotiate the peace agreement in Kabul. A major breakthrough occurs when Taliban leader Haissam Haqqani is himself discovered to be interested in ending the war. Saul meets with Haqqani to finalize a peace agreement, but negotiations collapse when a helicopter carrying President Warner and Afghan President Daoud crashes near a military outpost where the end of the war was just announced. Saul finds his advice falling on deaf ears in the White House after the brash and inexperienced Vice President Benjamin Hayes takes over the presidency. When tensions between the U.S. and Pakistan nearly culminate in a war, Saul and Carrie work to obtain the helicopter's flight recorder, which proves that the crash occurred due to mechanical failure, but is in the hands of the Russians. Carrie makes a deal with the GRU, agreeing to give up the identity of Saul's deeply embedded asset inside the Kremlin in exchange for the recorder. When Saul refuses to name his asset, Carrie independently identifies the individual as Anna Pomerantseva, the GRU's head interpreter who volunteered to defect for Saul in 1986 while in East Berlin. The effort ultimately succeeds in preventing a war between the U.S. and Pakistan, at the cost of Anna committing suicide to avoid capture by Russian authorities. Two years later, Carrie, having defected to Moscow, becomes Saul's new mole inside the Kremlin.

Jessica Brody
Played by Morena Baccarin, Jessica Brody is the wife of Nicholas Brody and mother of Dana and Chris.   In the eight years her husband is gone and presumed dead, Jessica does not remarry but does engage in a serious relationship with Brody's best friend Mike Faber, which is abruptly ended when Brody returns home.  The reunited couple struggle with their marriage. He resents Jessica's relationship with Mike.  Jessica, in turn, learns of Brody's affair with Carrie.  As his behavior becomes increasingly bizarre, Jessica suspects further infidelity. When Brody is off on a CIA-sanctioned mission, Jessica and Mike's relationship is rekindled. Nicholas and Jessica eventually come to a mutual agreement that their marriage cannot continue.

David Estes
Played by David Harewood, David Estes is the director of the CIA's Counterterrorism Center. He has a tense relationship with Carrie, partly due to a past affair with her which led to the end of Estes' marriage. He fires Carrie upon learning of her bipolar disorder and her multiple contraventions of CIA protocols, but later on, he must reinstate her when she is proven to have been right about Brody. Saul discovers that Estes and then-CIA-director Walden ordered a drone strike launched in Abu Nazir's homeland, resulting in the destruction of a nearby school and that his efforts to undermine Carrie were actually an attempt to cover up the incident.  Estes makes plans to have Brody assassinated once Abu Nazir is neutralized, and when Saul opposes this action, he threatens Saul's job.   He is among those killed when a bomb explodes at the CIA building.

Mike Faber
Played by Diego Klattenhoff, Mike Faber is Nick Brody's best friend, having served with him in the Marines. While Brody is presumed to be dead as a prisoner-of-war, Mike gets involved in a long-term relationship with Nick's wife Jessica and becomes very attached to her and the Brody family. The relationship is abruptly ended when Brody returns. The Brody family still comes to depend on Mike when they are neglected by Nicholas. Mike and a fellow Marine, Lauder Wakefield, feel that Brody may have had something to do with the murder of Tom Walker and investigate the matter. Saul and Estes talk him down from investigating further, but he eventually confronts Jessica with his theories. Mike and Jessica rekindle their affair while staying under CIA protection. Brody eventually gives Mike his blessing to look after his family after separating from Jessica. Mike and Jessica are seemingly vindicated in their suspicions about Brody when he is publicly framed for the bombing of the CIA's Langley headquarters. In the aftermath, Mike continues to assist Jessica amid the public scrutiny her family faces.

Chris Brody
Played by Jackson Pace, Chris Brody is the son of Nicholas and Jessica and younger brother to Dana.  Chris is too young to remember Nicholas before he went into service, and struggles to connect with his returned father at times.  When his father's behavior becomes more erratic, Chris finds comfort in the familiar presence of Mike Faber.

Dana Brody
Played by Morgan Saylor, Dana Brody is the daughter of Nicholas and Jessica and older sister to Chris. Intelligent and strong-minded, Dana is the member of the family with whom Brody feels most comfortable after his return home.  She is the only one to whom Brody freely admits his conversion to the Muslim faith.  Dana exhibits some resentment towards her mother for having had an affair with Mike.  When Brody is about to detonate his suicide vest at the State Department, Carrie convinces Dana to call him and "talk him down", which convinces Brody to not go through with the attack, though Dana is left not having any clue what Brody was planning to do.

While she is on a date with her boyfriend Finn Walden, Finn is driving recklessly, fatally strikes a pedestrian, then drives away.  Dana is overcome with guilt.  Her relationship with her father deteriorates when she wants to report the accident to the police, but her father doesn't allow it (his hand is forced by the CIA), much to her disillusionment.

When she watches the news showing that her father was turned in Afghanistan, Dana attempts suicide and is eventually placed in a psychiatric hospital, where she meets Leo Carras. The two begin a relationship and eventually run off together until Dana learns that Leo was possibly involved in the death of his own brother, which Leo told her was a suicide. After this, Dana changes her last name to disassociate herself from her father and moves out of the house. Psychologically ruined and disillusioned, she ends up cleaning motel rooms, seeing Brody one final time before he goes to Iran. Her father tries to reconnect with her, but Dana rejects him and claims to never want to see him again.

William Walden
Played by Jamey Sheridan, William Walden is the Vice President of the United States and a former director of the CIA. Both Brody and Abu Nazir hold him accountable for the drone strike that killed Nazir's son Issa. Walden capitalizes on Brody's political value following his return from captivity, offering him a seat in the House of Representatives in a special election. Not long after Brody is elected to Congress, Walden launches his own presidential bid and asks Brody to be his running mate. Walden is killed during a meeting with Brody when Nazir's associates tamper with his pacemaker. Brody agrees to provide the pacemaker's serial number for Nazir in exchange for releasing Carrie as his hostage. In Walden's dying moments, Brody finally disavows him in person and refuses to save him. Walden attended the University of Notre Dame and was an All-American football player there.

Virgil Piotrowski
Played by David Marciano, Virgil Piotrowski is a freelance surveillance expert and former CIA employee. He is one of Carrie's few friends. Carrie often enlists him to help her with surveillance operations, including that of Nicholas Brody's household. He frequently runs operations alongside his younger brother Max, also a freelancer with relatively less field experience but formidable technical skill.

Abu Nazir
Played by Navid Negahban, Abu Nazir is a high-ranking operative, possibly the operational leader, of al-Qaeda. Nazir oversees the captivity of prisoners of war Nicholas Brody and Tom Walker, and over a period of years is able to groom them both to turn on the U.S. and align with al-Qaeda. Issa, Nazir's son, is killed by a CIA-sanctioned drone strike. The incident is pivotal in shifting the allegiance of Brody, and also leads Nazir to swear revenge on the CIA and its director. He sends Brody and Walker back to the U.S. with a plot to kill Vice President Walden and many other officials, but it is thwarted by the efforts of Carrie Mathison.

Brody is captured by the CIA and forced to work with them against al-Qaeda. Nazir then infiltrates the United States himself with a new plan. First, he orchestrates the assassination of Vice President Walden, holding Carrie as a hostage as leverage to force Brody's assistance. He then sacrifices himself (killed by SWAT team), along with his cell (captured by CIA forces), in order to give the appearance that the terror threat has been neutralized. However, Nazir had planted a bomb in Brody's car, and one of his associates detonates the bomb at the CIA's headquarters, killing 219 people and wiping out much of the CIA's infrastructure, and setting up the innocent Brody as the culprit.

Peter Quinn
Played by Rupert Friend, Peter Quinn is a black ops officer working for a shadowy group within the CIA led by Dar Adal. He is an expert assassin who has spent most of his life conducting high-risk missions for the government. He often acts as a voice of reason to Carrie, for whom he develops romantic feelings, and remains drawn to working in the field despite repeatedly expressing his weariness and moral qualms with the work he does. Little is known regarding Quinn's personal background: he was recruited at age 16 by Dar Adal, who raised him to become a skilled operative and acted as a mentor figure to Quinn throughout his life. Quinn additionally had a son with a Philadelphia police officer named Julia Reyes, who knows Quinn only by his alias, "John."

Quinn is originally introduced as a CIA analyst brought in by Estes to head up the Brody task force. He clashes with Carrie as she is not very willing to take orders from him, but they come to respect each other's skills. Quinn is later discovered by Saul to be a black ops officer hired by Estes to assassinate Brody once Abu Nazir is neutralized. He ends up refusing to kill Brody, realizing that carrying out the job would only be advancing Estes' interests, and knowing the effect it would have on Carrie.

Quinn is later assigned to the CIA station in Islamabad, and sees action during the hunt for Saul Berenson after he is kidnapped, as well as Haissam Haqqani's assault on the US embassy – where Quinn's actions save the lives of many Americans. After Haqqani escapes, the US makes the decision to break off ties with Pakistan and the embassy is evacuated; despite orders to evacuate, Quinn remains in Islamabad, and reaches out to Astrid – a German intelligence officer and his former lover – who helps him locate Haqqani. He attempts to assassinate Haqqani using a pipe bomb, but Carrie gets him to stand down to avoid him from killing civilians. Shortly thereafter, Quinn returns to the U.S. and reunites with Carrie at her father's funeral. The night of the wake, Quinn and Carrie kiss, and he proposes that the two of them leave the CIA together. Carrie, afraid of destroying another relationship, decides to confront her estranged mother, who reassures her that her bipolar disorder does not stop her from finding love in her life. By the time Carrie attempts call Quinn, however, he has already accepted a high-risk mission in Syria with Dar Adal's group, believing that Carrie turned him down. Quinn spends the next two years running special ops missions in Syria.

In Berlin, Quinn is initially assigned to investigate a leak of classified documents dealing with cooperation between the CIA and German intelligence. Saul later recruits him for an off-the-books operation to target ISIS terrorists in Berlin, an operation that is complicated when Carrie's name ends up on his list. Quinn helps Carrie fake her death and rescues her from an ambush by assailants that turn out to be Russian intelligence officers. He later infiltrates an ISIS cell and discovers their plan to launch a chemical attack on Berlin. He attempts to convince them to stop the attack, but the ISIS recruits decide to use him as the test subject for their sarin gas chamber. One of the recruits, Qasim, gets qualms about the operation and injects Quinn with an antidote. Carrie and Saul  ask doctors to revive Quinn to query him for information on the impending terrorist attack, but Quinn is unresponsive and goes into respiratory arrest. Quinn is later hospitalized and suffers a massive brain hemorrhage, leaving little chance for survival. Carrie regularly visits Quinn, and receives a heartfelt letter he wrote for her.

Having returned to the US, Quinn is treated for PTSD at a hospital in Brooklyn, and suffers severe impairments to his speech, memory and motor capabilities as a result of his stroke. Carrie eventually moves Quinn into the ground floor of her apartment. While staying with Carrie, Quinn grows attached to Carrie's young daughter, Frannie, and cares for her while Carrie is away. Quinn soon becomes convinced that a man living across the street from Carrie is spying on her, which leads to him uncovering a vast conspiracy by Dar Adal's group to discredit (and later assassinate) President-elect Elizabeth Keane. Quinn ultimately sacrifices himself to save Carrie and Keane, driving through a barricade of armed soldiers sent to kill the President-elect and dying from his bullet wounds. Weeks later, Carrie cleans out Quinn's belongings from his apartment and finds photos of his estranged son over the years, as well one of herself, which moves her to tears.

Mira Berenson
Played by Sarita Choudhury, Mira Berenson is the wife (later ex-wife) of Saul Berenson. She leaves Saul to move to New Delhi, but she returns to the U.S. after the CIA bombing. She stays at Saul's side throughout his tenure as acting director of the CIA, though she briefly begins a relationship with another man, Alain Bernard, who is later revealed spying on Saul, acting on behalf of Andrew Lockhart. After breaking it off with Alain, she recommits to her marriage to Saul, which continues after his tenure at the CIA ends and he begins work in the private sector. However, after Saul rejoins the CIA, Mira files for divorce. They meet again in New York, as Saul prepares to go into hiding; their conversation causes Saul to reconsider.

Andrew Lockhart
Played by Tracy Letts, Senator Andrew Lockhart leads the committee investigating the bombing of the CIA. At a hunting retreat led by the White House Chief of Staff, Lockhart is revealed to be the nominee for director of the CIA to replace Saul. Lockhart clashes with Saul while the latter is still director, and hires an Israeli intelligence agent, Alan Bernard, to spy on him, a scheme which Saul uncovers. Lockhart also gives the order to have Brody eliminated after he becomes a liability for the U.S. during his mission in Iran.

As CIA director, Lockhart oversees the Islamabad crisis during the hunt for Taliban leader Haissam Haqqani, and goes to the Islamabad CIA station himself after Saul is captured by the Taliban. Lockhart unsuccessfully attempts to negotiate with the ISI for Saul's release. Later, when Haqqani and his men storm the U.S. embassy, Lockhart takes refuge with the U.S. ambassador and other officials while safeguarding a package of highly classified CIA intelligence. He is forced to give up the package when Haqqani threatens to kill CIA analyst Fara Sherazi (whom he murders anyway). In the aftermath of the fiasco, Lockhart attends the wake of Carrie's late father at her home, and informs Carrie, Saul and Quinn that he expects to be removed from his post as CIA director.

Dar Adal
Played by F. Murray Abraham, Dar Adal is a black ops specialist, leading a secretive cabal within the CIA (informally referred to as "the Group"). He is an old friend and colleague of Saul, as well as Peter Quinn's handler and longtime mentor, having recruited him to the agency when he was only 16 years old (it is later implied that he sexually groomed the young Quinn). Dar is discreet, calculated and highly pragmatic in his dealings, often overstepping legal and ethical boundaries to ensure what he believes is the best outcome.

Dar is introduced as having lent Quinn to Estes to oversee the Brody operation. Saul confronts Dar after learning that Quinn was sent to assassinate Brody in case the CIA's plans went awry. After Saul is named acting CIA director following the 12/12 bombing of the Langley headquarters, he and Dar work together to dismantle the network of Majid Javadi, the Iranian deputy intelligence chief who financed the attack. Saul, Carrie and Quinn secretly conduct an operation to convert Javadi into a CIA asset and send him back to Iran to be replaced as IRGC chief in hopes of regime change; though Dar only learns of the plan after its first stage is complete, he immediately supports Saul (unlike Senator Lockhart, who the two of them overstep to ensure the plan succeeds). Saul sends Brody into Iran to assassinate the existing intelligence chief; though Saul makes a longshot attempt to extract Brody afterwards as a promise to Carrie, Dar and Lockhart sidestep him and allow Brody to be captured and executed by Iranian authorities, knowing it would be operationally and politically more expedient.

After Taliban leader Haissam Haqqani invades the U.S. embassy in Islamabad and takes control of most of the region, Dar makes a deal with him, agreeing to remove Haqqani from the CIA's kill list in exchange for Haqqani denying sanctuary to terrorists in Afghanistan. Saul agrees to the deal despite his own near-death at the Taliban's hands in Islamabad after Dar informs him that he has negotiated the erasure of video footage of Saul's captivity under Haqqani, which would preserve Saul's chances of becoming CIA director. Carrie confronts Dar at his home, arguing that Saul would never agree to such a deal, but is dismayed to find Saul already at Dar's house, realizing he is complicit in Dar's political maneuvering.

Dar and Saul meet at the Berlin station to resolve the issue of data leaks. Due to the influence of Allison Carr, Dar and Saul come into conflict. In the course of this, both work alongside Carrie to find out about the terrorist attack in Berlin. At the end of this season, Dar Adal presented Carrie with the letter Quinn wrote to her before sailing to Syria.

When Senator Elizabeth Keane is elected President of the United States, Dar and Saul relocate to New York to advise her on the country's foreign policy and intelligence efforts. Dar begins secretly plotting with his cabal to undermine Keane out of concern that her antiwar platform will lead to undesirable overhauls of the intelligence community. He starts by seeding a rumor that Iran is running a parallel nuclear program with North Korea, thereby contravening the terms of their nuclear agreement. When Dar learns that Carrie is discreetly advising Keane on foreign policy, he begins working against her as well, sending one of his special operatives to spy on Carrie from across the street of her apartment, and calling child services to place her daughter Frannie in foster care. Dar also oversees the operations of a vast troll farm run by right-wing radio host and provocateur Brett O'Keefe to spread disinformation targeted at Keane. Dar soon learns that a faction within his cabal (led by General Jamie McClendon) has escalated the scope of the operation without his approval, and are now plotting to assassinate Keane and frame Quinn as the perpetrator. Dar calls Carrie to warn her about the assassination attempt; Quinn ultimately sacrifices himself to save Carrie and Keane. Dar is arrested and put in federal custody for his role in the conspiracy. Despite expressing regrets about losing control over his cabal, Dar nonetheless warns Saul that Keane cannot be trusted, and his suspicions are apparently corroborated when Keane arrests over 200 federal employees (including Saul) as backlash for the attempt on her life.

Senator Sam Paley, who is leading a Congressional investigation into the Keane administration, visits Dar in federal prison for insight regarding Saul's sudden trip to Russia. Dar infers that Saul and Carrie are conducting a special operation there, which leads Paley to discover that Saul is planning on exfiltrating a key witness in a Russian conspiracy to undermine Keane's presidency.

Fara Sherazi
Played by Nazanin Boniadi, Fara Sherazi is a young Iranian-American financial analyst, who assists Saul in linking the Langley bombing to Majid Javadi. She lives with her father, who was for a time unaware that she worked for the CIA. She has an uncle in Tehran, who assists Carrie when she goes there.

Fara later joins Carrie in Islamabad alongside Max Piotrowski as part of an underground task force assembled to track down Taliban leader Haissam Haqqani. Fara follows Haqqani's nephew, medical student Aayan Ibrahim, and discovers that Haqqani did not die in a drone strike that Carrie previously ordered on his compound. Carrie uses this information to seduce Aayan into unwittingly helping the CIA locate Haqqani, though this ultimately leads to Aayan's death at his uncle's hands. Haqqani later storms the U.S. embassy in Islamabad alongside a troupe of armed soldiers in search of a package containing highly classified intelligence about the CIA's network in the region. He takes Fara as a hostage and threatens to kill her unless CIA Director Andrew Lockhart turn over the package. Lockhart complies, but Haqqani nonetheless stabs Fara to death before escaping. Max, implied to have had romantic feelings for Fara, is left devastated by her death, and later chastises Carrie for being a harsh and ungrateful mentor to her.

Martha Boyd
Played by Laila Robins, Martha Boyd is the United States ambassador to the Islamic Republic of Pakistan. She and Saul were once romantically linked, and remain friends in the present day. Martha since married Dennis Boyd, an international studies professor who is later found to be the ISI's mole inside the U.S. embassy. Martha helps Carrie entrap Dennis; while in custody, he reveals to Martha that he leaked information about the embassy's secret underground entrance to the ISI, which they realize enabled Haissam Haqqani and his Taliban soldiers to storm the embassy and steal a package of top-secret CIA intelligence. In the aftermath of the massacre at the embassy, Dennis urges Martha to give him his belt so he can hang himself in his jail cell and prevent her from being indicted as an accessory to his crimes. Martha reluctantly complies, but later finds that Dennis did not kill himself and has instead been detained by the CIA.

Otto Düring
Played by Sebastian Koch, Otto Düring is the founder of the Düring Foundation, a philanthropic organization which is headquartered in Berlin. He hires Carrie Mathison to be his head of security. Otto provides Carrie his home as a temporary safe haven while she investigates the origins of an attempt on her life, and gives her a copy of classified CIA intel passed to him by Saul (which allows her to discover Allison Carr's double agent status). After Carrie stops a terrorist attack from occurring in Berlin, Otto proposes that she become his companion, expressing his admiration for her ambition, talent and world experience. However, she declines. Otto later provides seed funding for Carrie's philanthropic organization providing legal support to Muslims in New York City, and continues making romantic overtures to her over a period of months until she finally rebuffs him.

Allison Carr
Played by Miranda Otto, Allison Carr is the CIA station chief in Berlin. She is revealed to be a longtime double agent working for the Russians, having been blackmailed by SVR officer Ivan Krupin in 2005 while serving as a case officer in Baghdad. Ivan then became her handler and lover, receiving classified American intelligence in exchange for information that would help Allison rise the ranks of the CIA. Allison is shown to be cunning, materialistic and manipulative, initiating a sexual relationship with Saul following his divorce to gain trust within the upper echelons of the CIA.

In Berlin, Allison puts out a hit on Carrie after leaked CIA documents mention a connection between Carrie and Ahmed Nazari, one of Allison's high-value assets in Baghdad who was also working for the Russians. Carrie fakes her death and goes into hiding to uncover the conspiracy, and finds clues on Nazari's laptop indicating Allison's allegiance to the Russians. Carrie and Saul hatch a plan alongside German intelligence to lure Allison into being arrested alongside Ivan. Allison is soon released from custody to help thwart an incoming jihadist attack on Berlin. However, the Russians inform Allison that her final task is to ensure that the attack occurs. Allison tracks down one of the jihadists' accomplices, learns the time and location of the attack, then kills the man as well as her CIA escort before shooting herself in the shoulder to stage a shootout. At the hospital, she lies about the location of the attack to mislead the authorities, then escapes while unattended. Saul makes a deal with Ivan, offering him witness protection in the U.S. in exchange for intel on Allison's extraction procedure. Saul and a team intercept Allison's car and kill her.

Jonas Hollander
Played by Alexander Fehling, Jonas Hollander is a lawyer at the Düring Foundation and Carrie's boyfriend in Berlin. He begins to distance himself from Carrie after her old life begins seeping into their partnership. He does help provide medical supplies to an injured Peter Quinn, but walks out after Carrie refuses to abandon her mission. He ultimately breaks up with Carrie out of concern for his family's safety.

Laura Sutton
Played by Sarah Sokolovic, Laura Sutton is a dissident American journalist at the Düring Foundation. She publishes leaked CIA documents attesting to mass privacy violations by the American and German governments, having received the files from a pair of hackers. Laura later makes contact with one of the hackers, Numan, who promises her the remainder of the documents. When the BND detain Faisal Marwan, a suspected jihadist who was released after the documents scandal, Laura goes on air threatening to release the remainder of the documents unless Faisal is released from custody, claiming that his civil liberties have been violated. However, Faisal commits suicide to avoid being interrogated. After Numan is arrested by the BND, Astrid threatens Laura with his deportation unless she gives the documents and goes on air denouncing Faisal as a terrorist. Laura reluctantly complies.

Elizabeth Keane
Played by Elizabeth Marvel, Elizabeth Keane is the President of the United States. Before she takes office, Keane enlists Carrie as a foreign policy advisor, while things are complicated by Dar Adal's attempts to manipulate her agenda. After a special ops group attempts to assassinate her, Keane lashes out at the U.S. intelligence community, ordering dozens of arrests, including Saul Berenson. She ultimately resigns the presidency.

David Wellington 
Played by Linus Roache, David Wellington is the White House Chief of Staff to Presidents Elizabeth Keane, Ralph Warner and Benjamin Hayes. He is Keane's close friend and former campaign manager during her Congressional days, and is hired after Keane's previous chief of staff, Rob Emmons, is killed. In the early days of Keane's administration, Wellington learns that his on-and-off girlfriend, Simone Martin, is a Russian spy attempting to implicate him for the assassination of General Jamie McClendon, thereby sabotaging the Keane administration. After Keane resigns and her vice president, Ralph Warner, takes over, Wellington remains on as chief of staff. When Warner dies in a helicopter crash and his inexperienced VP, Benjamin Hayes, inherits the presidency, Wellington finds much of his advice falling on deaf ears.

Max Piotrowski 
Played by Maury Sterling, Max Piotrowski is Virgil's younger brother, who works with him on freelance security consulting operations. Max is reserved and socially awkward, but technically adept and competent at reconnaissance work. He and Virgil help Carrie throughout the Brody investigation, installing surveillance in the Brody family's home and monitoring his activities after he becomes a CIA asset. Carrie later enlists Max alongside Fara Sherazi to her task force in Islamabad to help her find Taliban leader Haissam Haqqani. During this time, Max forms a close bond and partnership with Fara, for whom he harbors romantic feelings, until Haqqani murders Fara during a Taliban raid on the U.S. embassy. Max spends the next two years in a deep depression, and claims to have developed a methamphetamine habit to cope with his grief.

Max later moves to New York to help Carrie take care of Peter Quinn, who is recovering from a stroke. When Quinn uncovers a homegrown conspiracy against the President-elect, Max goes undercover in Brett O'Keefe's shadowy private company, which he learns is a troll farm whose services are being solicited by Dar Adal. Dar himself enlists Max's help in uncovering a plot to frame Quinn for the murder of the President-elect. After Keane's inauguration, Max continues aiding Carrie in Washington D.C., installing surveillance in Chief of Staff David Wellington's apartment, and assisting in the investigation of Simone Martin. Saul forcibly recruits Max into his Russia task force, where Max helps Carrie and Saul extract Simone from Moscow. Max and the rest of the group are personally thanked by President Keane for their efforts in thwarting the Russian conspiracy against the White House.

About a year later, Max joins a military unit in Afghanistan, still seeking justice against Haqqani and the Taliban for Fara's death. When President Warner is killed in a helicopter crash, Max and the team are dispatched to the scene. Carrie has Max retrieve the flight recorder from the helicopter to ascertain the cause of the crash; Max succeeds, but the rest of his unit is killed by the Taliban, while he is captured a lone Taliban soldier who sells off the flight recorder. Carrie and Yevgeny Gromov track down Max, who gives Carrie the flight recorder's location before being escorted to another safehouse. At the second compound, Max is held prisoner by Haqqani's son Jalal, who threatens to execute Max unless Haqqani's death sentence is revoked. When Haqqani is executed, Jalal kills Max. While waiting for Max's body to be collected, Carrie breaks down in tears while expressing her guilt over taking Max for granted.

Brett O'Keefe 
Played by Jake Weber, Brett O'Keefe is an influential right-wing radio personality. He also presides over an underground corporation that deploys vast amounts of fake social media accounts in order to influence the general population with his agenda; one of his main orders of business is to discredit Keane before she takes office.

After Keane's inauguration, O'Keefe is labeled a fugitive and goes on the run, eventually taking shelter in Lucasville, Ohio with the Elkins family, most of whom staunchly support him. When Saul arrives with the FBI, a standoff ensues between the Elkins family (alongside their armed reinforcements) and the authorities. Saul attempts to negotiate with O'Keefe to deescalate the situation, but O'Keefe allows tensions to rise so that he can broadcast the event live. The standoff eventually culminates in a shootout that results in mass casualties, largely on the Elkins' side. O'Keefe is detained by the FBI and kept in federal custody.

Dante Allen 
Played by Morgan Spector, Dante Allen is an FBI agent formerly stationed in the CIA's Kabul outpost during Carrie's tenure as station chief.

In the early days of Elizabeth Keane's presidential administration, Dante is part of the team investigating the 200 federal employees Keane arrests as backlash for an assassination attempt months prior. Carrie, believing them to be innocent, enlists Dante's help in securing their release by receiving insider information on misconduct within the White House. Carrie and Dante begin investigating David Wellington, the president's chief of staff, for possible links to the assassination of Jamie McClendon, the corrupt U.S. Army General who spearheaded the plot to eliminate Keane. However, Carrie finds evidence of Wellington's innocence; Saul helps her realize that Dante is likely setting her up to sabotage Wellington on behalf of Russia.

Carrie begins investigating Dante and learns from his ex-wife that he harbored resentment for Carrie in Kabul after her botched drone strike, which resulted in her promotion and his career decline. Carrie surmises that the Russians exploited this vulnerability to recruit Dante to their mission. Dante offers Carrie his apartment as a temporary home for her and her daughter, Frannie. While there, Carrie and Dante confront each other over their mutual suspicion of one another, but it leads to the two of them having sex. However, Saul's team bursts in and captures Dante. During his interrogation, Dante refuses to cooperate with the CIA. Carrie and Saul send in a decoy lawyer to poison him in a manner similar to McClendon; believing the Russians are responsible, Dante admits that Wellington's girlfriend Simone Martin is a Russian asset involved in the plot to kill McClendon. Dante is rushed to the hospital after entering cardiac arrest; when he recovers, he discloses to Carrie the secret Twitter code used by the Russians to dissolve their online network. Dante is eventually found in the hospital by his Russian handler, GRU lieutenant colonel Yevgeny Gromov, who denies Russia's role in Dante's poisoning and suggests that the CIA was responsible. Yevgeny has Dante call Carrie to confirm his suspicions, but Dante warns Carrie that Yevgeny is in the room with him. Yevgeny smothers Dante to death using his hospital pillow, with Carrie arriving at the hospital too late to save him.

Yevgeny Gromov 
Played by Costa Ronin, Yevgeny Gromov is a lieutenant colonel in the GRU, Russia's intelligence directorate. He is notorious for conducting disinformation campaigns within governments across the world, the latest being a vast conspiracy to undermine President Keane. Yevgeny is discovered to be employing a network of sock puppets on Twitter as well as handling several moles in proximity to the U.S. government - these include FBI agent Dante Allen (who is murdered by Yevgeny for being a risk as he did with Clayton and Ivan Krupin), as well as Simone Martin, Yevgeny's lover who he extracts from federal witness protection back to Moscow(Simone was almost murdered by Gromov when she became a risk). Saul and Carrie eventually hatch an operation to exfiltrate Simone from Russia so that she can testify in Congress; Carrie wears a wig to mimic Simone's appearance and lures Yevgeny and his men away from Simone long enough for Saul and his team to take her back to the U.S. Carrie is captured by Yevgeny and placed in a Russian gulag, where Yevgeny confiscates her medication unless she records a statement disavowing the CIA. Carrie refuses, and ends up spending the next seven months in captivity until Saul gets her released. During Carrie's captivity, Yevgeny "saves" her from attempting to commit suicide by hanging.

Yevgeny is later stationed in Kabul, where Russia has connections with the Taliban. He stages several encounters with Carrie to get close to her, and reveals during a conversation that the two of them developed a "close" bond during her captivity (which she cannot remember), which led to her divulging various personal secrets to Yevgeny. Carrie's CIA superiors at the Kabul station believe her to have been turned by the Russians due to her relationship with Yevgeny; due to the mutual distrust between her and the CIA, Carrie goes rogue and enlists Yevgeny's help in tracking down Max Piotrowski, as well as the flight recorder on President Warner's downed helicopter. The two eventually find the recorder, which proves that the crash occurred due to mechanical failure. Carrie confronts Yevgeny as to the nature of their relationship in Moscow, leading to the two of them kissing. Yevgeny then sedates Carrie and has his men take the flight recorder; he later makes a deal with Carrie, offering to exchange the flight recorder for the identity of Saul's deeply-embedded asset inside the Kremlin. Yevgeny tells her that the asset must be neutralized one way or another and the only way to stop this is to eliminate said asset or stop the person who is passing the information to the United States. This means that she must kill Saul.

Carrie reluctantly agrees and ultimately succeeds in finding the asset, she completely burned Saul's asset, Anna Pomerantseva (Tatyana Mukha). The asset winded up killing herself, without killing Saul. He was devastated by that. The effect of that all happening was, Carrie was able to avert a war between the U.S. and Pakistan from happening, but the relationship with Saul was severed. She and Yevgeny escape to Russia.

Two years later, Carrie has defected to Moscow and is in a "relationship" with Yevgeny; the two of them live together in the latter's lavish apartment. Yevgeny congratulates her on completing a book denouncing the U.S., unaware that Carrie is secretly operating as Saul's new Russian asset.

Tasneem Qureishi

Portrayed by Nimrat Kaur, Tasneem Qureishi is an Inter-Services Intelligence (ISI) agent in Pakistan, and later the organization's Director-General. She is introduced as an antagonist, aiding Haissam Haqqani and the Taliban's takeover of the region in effort to drive out the Americans. Years later, she becomes Saul's ally amid escalating tensions between the U.S. and Pakistan, hoping to avoid a war. She attempts to talk Haqqani's son Jalal out of waging war on the West, but reverses course after witnessing the dramatic increase in the Taliban's ranks under Jalal's leadership.

Haissam Haqqani
Played by Numan Acar, Haissam Haqqani is a Taliban commander, and later the organization's leader.

Haqqani is introduced as a high-value CIA target whose compound in Kabul is destroyed by a drone strike ordered by Carrie. However, Carrie later learns that Haqqani was not present at the blast site and is instead in hiding, receiving deliveries of medicine from his nephew Aayan Ibrahim (who survived the blast). Carrie leads Aayan into a meeting with Haqqani in the mountains, but Haqqani emerges with a captured Saul, aware that the CIA has drones overhead ready to assassinate him. He executes Aayan for leading him into a trap. Over the next several days, Haqqani uses Saul as a human shield to travel through Pakistan freely, reuniting with his family after years and reestablishing his public notoriety in the area. Haqqani uses Saul as a bargaining chip to negotiate the release of several Taliban prisoners in U.S. custody. He then brings a troupe of armed Taliban soldiers to storm the U.S. embassy in search of a package containing classified intelligence on the CIA's network in the area. Haqqani and his men slaughter several CIA personnel before retrieving the package and escaping. The attack bolsters Haqqani's presence in the region and allows him to rise the ranks of the Taliban. He covertly makes a deal with Dar Adal, agreeing not to harbor terrorists in Afghanistan, in exchange for being removed from the CIA's kill list.

Years later, Haqqani grows weary of war and becomes interested in negotiating peace in the region. Saul capitalizes on the opportunity, arranging a meeting with Haqqani to broker a peace agreement. The meeting is ambushed by the ISI; Haqqani survives and learns that his eldest son Jalal betrayed him to the ISI over his opposition to peace talks. Haqqani stops short of killing his son and instead exiles him from the family, unaware that Jalal was later picked up by Tasneem. After a helicopter carrying U.S. President Warner and Afghan President Daoud crashes in the mountains, killing both world leaders, Afghanistan's new president, General Abdul Qadir G'ulom, publicly blames Haqqani for the attack and orders his arrest. Haqqani turns himself in to the U.S., hoping for a fair trial, but is swiftly sentenced to death and executed by a firing squad.

Recurring characters
The following is a list of recurring characters who have appeared in at least three episodes of a season or in at least two episodes of two different seasons. The characters are listed in the order they were first credited in the series.

Helen Walker
Played by Afton Williamson, Helen Walker is the wife of Tom Walker.  Aware of his terrorist affiliations, Helen Walker initially agrees to cooperate with the CIA to apprehend her husband Tom.  However, at a critical moment, she tips off Tom, allowing him to narrowly escape.

Maggie Mathison
Played by Amy Hargreaves, Margaret "Maggie" Mathison is Carrie Mathison's sister. Maggie is usually the person that Carrie goes to for support when having personal problems. As a medical doctor (though not a psychiatrist), Maggie secretly obtains medication for Carrie to control her bipolar disorder. Maggie also strives to remain in touch with her family, letting her and Carrie's father Frank stay in her home, and herself having a husband and two kids. Once Carrie gives birth to her daughter, Frannie, Maggie is largely responsible for taking care of the child, given Carrie's enduring commitment to her intelligence work. Carrie and Frannie move in with Maggie after Carrie is fired from her job at the White House. However, Carrie's increasing inability to look after her child, as well as the repeated trauma to which she exposes Frannie because of her field work, leaves Maggie no choice but to seek custody of Frannie. At the custody hearing, Carrie accepts an agreement allowing her to see Frannie every other weekend.

Latif Bin Walid
Played by Alok Tewari, Latif Bin Walid is the majordomo for Prince Farid who was an agent for Abu Nazir.

Raqim Faisel
Played by Omid Abtahi, Raqim Faisel, along with his girlfriend Aileen Morgan, are low-level al-Qaeda operatives living in the United States.  He is a professor at Bryden University in Washington D.C. As part of an al-Qaeda plot, Morgan and Faisel are assigned to purchase a house within sniper range of a Marine One landing pad. The CIA discovers the house, sending them on the run. Faisel is murdered by unknown assailants while he and Aileen are hiding out at a motel.

Aileen Morgan
Played by Marin Ireland, Aileen Margaret Morgan, along with her boyfriend Raqim Faisel, are low-level al-Qaeda operatives living in the United States.  Morgan was born in the U.S. but took on an anti-American perspective while living her teenage years in Saudi Arabia.  As part of an al-Qaeda plot, Morgan and Faisel are assigned to purchase a house within sniper range of a Marine One landing pad.   The CIA discovers the house, sending them on the run.  Faisel is killed, and Morgan is arrested in Mexico by Saul Berenson.  In exchange for Raqim Faisel receiving a Muslim burial, she identifies the al-Qaeda accomplice who had been sent to her house as ex-Marine Tom Walker. Morgan ultimately commits suicide during a lengthy stay in solitary confinement.

Danny Galvez
Played by Hrach Titizian, Danny Galvez is a Muslim-American CIA officer with a Lebanese mother and a Guatemalan father who assists Carrie in most of her cases. He is attacked in one of his missions and shot, and takes a few weeks to recover. He is then believed to be a mole by Carrie, but her suspicions are proven wrong when he presents his alibi for leaving the compound.

Frank Mathison
Played by James Rebhorn, Frank Mathison is Carrie Mathison's father. Like Carrie, Frank also has bipolar disorder, but is able to manage it more effectively than his daughter due to his commitment to therapy and medication. Frank eventually dies in his sleep from a stroke while Carrie is working overseas; Carrie returns home to arrange his funeral.

Lauder Wakefield
Played by Marc Menchaca, Lauder Wakefield is a disabled, alcoholic ex-Marine who served in the same platoon as Nicholas Brody, Tom Walker, and Mike Faber. When Brody returns, Lauder is antagonistic towards him. Mike beat him up for telling the truth about what was going on between him and Brody's wife, Jessica. He comes to suspect that Brody was involved in the death of Tom Walker.

Tom Walker
Played by Chris Chalk, Thomas Patrick Walker is a Marine who was in active duty along with Nicholas Brody when they were both captured by al-Qaeda forces.  Walker, like Brody, becomes loyal to al-Qaeda after several years as a prisoner-of-war. Both men are dispatched to the United States with roles in an impending terrorist attack. Walker's cover is blown when he is identified by Aileen Morgan, triggering a national manhunt. Walker successfully carries out his part in the attack, assassinating Elizabeth Gaines and causing a mass evacuation into the State Department. Afterwards, Abu Nazir commands Brody to kill Walker, due to Walker's exposed identity.

Roya Hammad
Played by Zuleikha Robinson, Roya Hammad is a television news reporter who secretly works for al-Qaeda, acting as an intermediary between Abu Nazir and Brody. She is eventually arrested, along with her cell, when Brody gives the CIA information regarding their planned attack on a soldiers' homecoming event.

Finn Walden
Played by Timothée Chalamet, Finn Walden is the wealthy, spoiled son of Vice President Walden. He meets Dana in private school and goes on to date her. He perpetrates a fatal hit and run on a date with Dana when he is driving recklessly, and then insists that Dana keep it a secret. He is listed among those killed when a bomb goes off outside his father's memorial service.

Cynthia Walden
Played by Talia Balsam, Cynthia Walden is the wife of Vice President William Walden.   When Brody is elected as a U.S. Representative, Cynthia befriends and takes Jessica Brody under her wing.  When her son Finn causes a car accident that results in the death of a pedestrian, Cynthia orchestrates a cover-up. Cynthia, along with her son Finn, is killed in the bombing that took place at the CIA Headquarters during her husband's memorial.

Scott Ryan
Played by Tim Guinee, Scott Ryan is the chief of special operations at the CIA. He oversees the operation to eliminate Majid Javadi's terrorist network in Iran, as well as the operation (led by Brody) to assassinate IRGC Chief Danesh Akbari. Years later, he assists Saul in negotiating peace talks between the U.S. and Afghanistan, and attempts to save Anna Pomerantseva, Saul's highly valuable Russian asset, from capture by the GRU.

Leo Carras
Played by Sam Underwood, Leo Carras is Dana's boyfriend who she meets while in therapy. After Dana is released, she continues sneaking into the hospital to see Leo, and the two of them soon run away together. Jessica and Mike investigate and learn that Leo was only placed in psychiatric care to cover up his possible involvement in his brother's death, which he claimed was a suicide to Dana. Dana confronts Leo after seeing news reports on their disappearance name Leo as a suspect in his brother's death. Leo confesses that his brother died while the two of them were playing Russian Roulette with their father's gun at Leo's suggestion.

Paul Franklin
Played by Jason Butler Harner, Paul Franklin is an associate of Bennett's law firm, who arranges a meeting between Carrie and Bennett. When he and Bennett are led to believe that the CIA has discovered the Langley bomber, Franklin arrives at the motel where he had been hiding out, and kills him.

Majid Javadi
Played by Shaun Toub, Majid Javadi is the Deputy Intelligence Chief of Iran, who engineered the bombing on the CIA (for which Nicholas Brody was publicly framed). Javadi had worked with Saul in the past but betrayed him when he killed several American hostages who Saul was attempting to extradite from Iran. In retaliation, Saul helped Javadi's wife and son escape to the United States. After the bombing, he attempts to turn Carrie against the CIA, but the plan fails and he is blackmailed into becoming a CIA asset when Carrie and Saul find that he had embezzled millions from his own nation to fund the attack. On his way to meet with Saul, Javadi takes a detour to the new residence of his ex-wife and daughter-in-law, and brutally murders them both before surrendering himself to Carrie and Quinn (who are too late to arrive). Saul has Javadi return to Iran as the CIA's asset; Javadi complies, given that his only alternative is to return to his country as an enemy of the state. Saul engineers a special operation to have Brody assassinate Danesh Akbari, Javadi's superior, allowing Javadi to become the IRGC's Intelligence Chief and help advance American interests in the Middle East.

Years later, Saul covertly meets with Javadi in the West Bank amid rumors in Washington that Iran is running a parallel nuclear program, thereby violating the terms of their agreement with the IAEA. Javadi denies it, and later comes to the U.S. himself, seeking political asylum after his dealings with the Americans are leaked to the Iranian government. Saul promises Javadi protection if he confirms with President-elect Keane that Iran is not contravening the nuclear treaty. Javadi agrees, but reverses course at the meeting with Keane, stating that Iran is indeed running an underground nuclear program. He explains to Saul that he made a deal with Dar Adal for his own protection, but Dar ultimately betrays Javadi to Mossad, who capture him. Carrie later finds Javadi's phone at the scene of his extraction, which contains footage from an interrogation of an Iranian Mossad asset who confirms that Iran is not violating the treaty.

Alain Bernard
Played by William Abadie, Alain Bernard is an apparent friend of Mira Berenson, revealed to be having an affair with her. He was later found to be an Israeli intelligence agent working for Lockhart, using Mira to get close to Saul, who he was spying on. Saul visits Alain in federal custody and has him send his contacts in Mossad to aid a CIA operation in Tehran.

Michael Higgins
Played by William Sadler, Michael "Mike" Higgins is the White House Chief of Staff. At a hunting retreat, Higgins announces that Senator Lockhart will become the new director of the CIA.

Aayan Ibrahim
Played by Suraj Sharma, Aayan Ibrahim is a medical student studying in Islamabad. He is one of the survivors of a CIA drone strike intended for his uncle, Taliban leader Haissam Haqqani, which instead struck a wedding that killed several civilians including Aayan's mother and sister. Aayan discovers a video he recorded on his phone of the wedding at the moment of his explosion, which his friend Rahim leaks to the Pakistani press. Aayan is later threatened by the ISI to no longer talk to the media, but Carrie, posing as a journalist, offers Aayan safe passage to London to continue his studies in exchange for his participation in her "news story". Aayan is unaware that it is a ruse intended to get him to disclose the whereabouts of his uncle Haqqani, to whom he is covertly delivering medical supplies. Carrie seduces Aayan as part of her recruitment process, causing him to fall in love with her. Carrie ultimately leads Aayan to a monitored rendezvous with Haqqani, who executes him for leading him into the CIA's trap.

John Redmond
Played by Michael O'Keefe, John Redmond is a CIA agent stationed in Islamabad, who was named acting station chief after the death of his predecessor, Sandy Bachman. However, Carrie maneuvers to get herself placed as the Islamabad station chief. Redmond is initially resentful of the decision and briefly lapses into alcoholism, but eventually becomes Carrie's trusted ally in her hunt for Taliban leader Haissam Haqqani. Redmond is ultimately killed during an RPG attack on a CIA convoy returning from a prisoner exchange between the American and Pakistani governments.

Dennis Boyd
Played by Mark Moses, Dennis Boyd is an international studies professor at a university in Islamabad. He is married to U.S. Ambassador Martha Boyd, and was secretly sharing classified intelligence with the CIA's Islamabad station chief, Sandy Bachman, which allowed the CIA to eliminate various high-value Taliban outposts. After Sandy's death, Dennis is blackmailed by ISI agent Tasneem Qureishi into becoming the ISI's mole inside the U.S. embassy.

Aasar Khan
Played by Raza Jaffrey, Aasar Khan is a colonel in the ISI, loyal to his country but largely kept out of the loop in the Pakistani government's dealings with the Taliban. He provides shelter for Carrie as she recovers from a severe psychotic episode induced by the ISI having her bipolar medication swapped for a powerful hallucinogen. Khan later learns from ISI agent Tasneem Qureishi that the poisoning was engineered to get Carrie transferred out of Islamabad, but that his intervention foiled their plans. Khan continues to help Carrie afterwards, providing her the name of Dennis Boyd as the ISI's mole inside the U.S. embassy. During the Taliban's attack on the embassy, Carrie calls Khan to send in backup, but Tasneem stops him, revealing to him her allegiance with the Taliban. Khan later stops Carrie from assassinating Haqqani, alerting to her to Dar Adal's presence in Haqqani's entourage.

Bunran Latif
Played by Art Malik, Bunran "Bunny" Latif is a general in the Pakistani army and the former head of the ISI. He is an old friend and colleague of Saul's who has since developed a deep animosity for the United States due to their foreign policy decisions post-9/11. Under his leadership, the ISI helps the Taliban undermine U.S. presence in Islamabad, which culminates in an attack on the American embassy that results in the U.S. pulling out of the region. Years later, Latif passes on leadership of the ISI to his stepdaughter, Tasneem Qureishi, who proved instrumental in helping the Taliban initially succeed.

Astrid
Played by Nina Hoss, Astrid is a German intelligence officer working for BND. She shares years of on-again, off-again sexual history with Peter Quinn, for whom she has unrequited romantic feelings. For a time, Astrid is stationed in Islamabad, where she helps Quinn track down Haissam Haqqani (and meets Carrie along the way, repeatedly referring to her as Quinn's "girlfriend"). Two years later, Astrid helps Carrie and Quinn uncover a Russian conspiracy to infiltrate the CIA's Berlin station. When Quinn is captured by a jihadist cell and used as a test subject for a planned sarin gas attack, Astrid helps Carrie track down the location of the compound where Quinn was being held, ultimately rescuing him.

Months later, Astrid breaks Quinn out of a New York psychiatric facility, bringing him to a remote cabin on Dar Adal's behalf and looking after him. However, a traumatized Quinn distrusts Astrid and repeatedly lashes out at her, and later empties the bullets out of Astrid's gun while she is away. That night, a rogue assassin from Dar Adal's black ops group ambushes the cabin and kills a defenseless Astrid. Quinn, feeling immense guilt over Astrid's death, eventually tracks down the assassin and brutally murders him as revenge.

Numan
Played by Atheer Adel, Numan is a hacker operating out of Berlin, where he immigrated from Turkey. Numan and his partner Korzenik uncover a trove of CIA documents revealing at the CIA and the BND violated the privacy of German citizens as part of a counterterrorism effort. Numan leaks one of the documents to journalist Laura Sutton, who publishes them, causing a national scandal. He later contacts Laura personally to give her the rest, but learns that Korzenik sold them to Russian intelligence officers. Numan later finds that the Russians murdered Korzenik and his girlfriend. Laura introduces Numan to Carrie, who he helps investigate a Russian conspiracy to infiltrate the CIA. He is eventually arrested by the BND.

Armand Korzenik
Played by Sven Schelker, Armand Korzenik is a hacker operating in Berlin alongside his partner, Numan. The two uncover CIA documents revealing mass violations of the privacy of German citizens by the American and German governments. Korzenik attempts to sell copies of the documents to Russian intelligence, but they torture him for the location of the other copies before killing him and his girlfriend.

Etai Luskin
Played by Allan Corduner, Etai Luskin is an Israeli ambassador and old friend and colleague of Saul Berenson. Etai has Saul extracted from CIA custody under the guise of defection after the CIA unduly suspect Saul of working against them. Etai brings Carrie to the safehouse he prepares for Saul, allowing the two of them to uncover the Russians' infiltration of the CIA's Berlin station. Months later, Etai detains Saul on his way back from the West Bank, inquiring about a covert meeting Saul held (which, unbeknownst to Etai, was with Majid Javadi). However, Etai is forced to release Saul after reports emerge about a bombing in New York City.

Ivan Krupin
Played by Mark Ivanir, Ivan Krupin is a high-ranking Russian intelligence officer in the SVR. Years ago, Ivan groomed CIA officer Allison Carr into becoming a mole for Russia, receiving vital state secrets in exchange for information that would advance Allison up the ranks of the CIA. Ivan works as Allison's handler during her tenure as station chief in Berlin, and orders a hit on Carrie due to her association with one of Allison's former assets (who was also working with Russia). Ivan is eventually apprehended by the CIA during a sting operation to expose Allison's ties to Russia. He agrees to give Saul details on the SVR's plan to extract Allison from Germany in exchange for witness protection in the United States.

Saul later visits Ivan in Wyoming, where is staying under witness protection, to inquire about possible Russian interference with the administration of President Elizabeth Keane. Saul names Yevgeny Gromov, a GRU operative known for his disinformation efforts; Ivan feigns ignorance, but later comes out of witness protection to confront Yevgeny himself, who considers Ivan the product of a bygone era of Russian intelligence efforts. Yevgeny and his men later intercept Ivan during a planned rendezvous with Saul and drown him, leaving evidence of his death for Saul to find.

Qasim
Played by Alireza Bayram, Qasim is a young, inexperienced recruit to an ISIS cell operating out of Berlin, led by Qasim's cousin Bibi Hamed. Qasim becomes doubtful about the jihadists' mission after learning that it involves a chemical attack on Berlin. While being held captive, Quinn persuades Qasim to help stop the attack. When the jihadists use Quinn as a test subject for their sarin gas chamber, Qasim discreetly injects him with an antidote to save his life. On the day of the attack, which is to occur at the Berlin train station, Carrie finds Qasim and convinces him to stop Bibi from launching the weapon. Qasim confronts Bibi, who kills him before being shot dead by Carrie, thus thwarting the attack.

Bibi Hamed
Played by René Ifrah, Bibi Hamed is the leader of a jihadist cell operating out of Berlin. After learning that Bibi's uncle is an influential emir in Syria's terrorist network, Quinn decides to accompany the jihadists to Syria, posing as a mercenary. However, Bibi reveals that his plan never was to go to Syria, but rather launch a chemical attack on Berlin itself. The jihadists hold Quinn prisoner and use him as a test subject for their sarin chamber. Bibi's cousin Qasim saves Quinn's life by injecting him with an antidote; Bibi kills another member of the team as punishment, knowing Qasim was responsible but refusing to kill a family member. At the train station where the attack is to take place, Carrie convinces Qasim to stop Bibi from releasing the weapon. When Qasim confronts his cousin, Bibi kills him, only to be shot dead himself by Carrie, thus stopping the attack.

Frannie Mathison
Played by an uncredited baby actress in season 4, twins Luna and Lotta Pfitzer in season 5, and Claire and McKenna Keane in seasons 6 and 7, Frances "Frannie" Mathison is the daughter of Carrie Mathison and Nicholas Brody, born after her father's death. Carrie initially avoids taking care of her daughter, leaving the infant Frannie to stay with Maggie while away in Kabul, and nearly drowning the child in a bathtub while spending a day watching over her. Carrie eventually embraces motherhood after returning from Islamabad, and takes Frannie with her to stay in Berlin. After discovering that someone ordered a hit on her, Carrie has Frannie sent back to the U.S. for her own safety.

Months later, Carrie and Frannie live in New York. Carrie allows Quinn, who is recovering from a stroke, to stay in the lower floor of her apartment. During this time, Quinn bonds with Frannie and protects her when a crowd of protestors and press swarm the apartment. However, this leads to a tense standoff with the authorities, leading child services to take Frannie away, deeming Carrie a risk to her daughter. Carrie negotiates to reclaim custody of Frannie and moves with her to Maggie's house after leaving her job at the White House. After an argument with Maggie, Carrie takes Frannie with her, and the two struggle to find a place to stay until Dante Allen offers them his apartment as temporary living quarters. Carrie accepts despite suspecting Dante to be a Russian agent; the two have sex while Frannie is asleep, but Saul's men burst in and apprehend Dante, traumatizing Frannie. While picking up Frannie from school, Carrie abruptly leaves to save Dante from being eliminated by the Russians, and nearly hits Frannie with her car on the way out. Maggie, considering Carrie's treatment of her daughter to be negligent and abusive, files for custody of Frannie. Carrie gives up the custody battle, accepting a visitation agreement that allows her to see Frannie every other weekend.

Rob Emmons
Played by Hill Harper, Rob Emmons is President-elect Elizabeth Keane's trusted chief of staff. He is eventually killed in a car explosion intended for Keane.

Jamie McClendon
Played by Robert Knepper, General Jamie McClendon is a corrupt military officer who leads a faction of Dar Adal's black ops group in a conspiracy to assassinate President-elect Keane, planning to frame Quinn as the culprit. After the plot is thwarted, McClendon is sentenced to life in prison. However, he dies from poisoning as soon as he enters custody, and is later found to have been assassinated by the Russians in an attempt to sabotage the Keane administration.

Ray Conlin
Played by Dominic Fumusa, Ray Conlin is an FBI agent who initially clashes with Carrie over his investigation into Sekou Bah. After Sekou dies in a car bombing for which he is framed, Conlin begins helping Carrie investigate a possible conspiracy behind the attack. He trails a vehicle belonging to a suspicious man living across from Carrie's apartment to a mysterious private corporation hiring former federal employees. Soon afterwards, he is assassinated in his home by the man he was investigating, who was in fact one of Dar Adal's operatives.

Reda Hashem
Played by Patrick Sabongui, Reda Hashem is a lawyer and the head of Fair Trial, a New York City nonprofit defending the civil liberties of Muslims. He and Carrie work together to clear the name of Sekou Bah, a teenager detained by the FBI on terrorism charges.

Sekou Bah
Played by J. Mallory McCree, Sekou Bah is a Muslim teenager living in New York City who alerts the FBI's attention after posting a series of online videos denouncing U.S. foreign policy in the Middle East and sympathizing with Al-Qaeda. Carrie works with her nonprofit to get Sekou released from jail. The next day, Sekou dies in an explosion from a bomb planted in his work van. He is publicly named as the perpetrator of the attack, but Carrie and Quinn discover that Jamie McClendon's group planted the bomb and framed Sekou.

Aby Bah
Played by Zainab Jah, Aby Bah is the mother of Sekou Bah and his sister Simone.

Simone Bah
Played by Ashlei Sharpe Chestnut, Simone Bah is the daughter of Aby Bah and the sister of Sekou Bah.

Saad Mahsud
Played by Leo Manzari, Saad Mahsud is a friend of Sekou Bah who secretly works as an informant for FBI agent Ray Conlin. Saad was pressured into helping the FBI entrap Sekou on false charges. Saad later helps Conlin confirm that Sekou was not responsible for the car bombing in which he and two other civilians were killed.

Porteous Belli
Played by C.J. Wilson, Porteous Belli is the alias of a shadow operative working for Dar Adal's black ops group. He initially spies on Carrie from an apartment across the street from her. Quinn soon begins to suspect Belli and starts following him, learning he was responsible for planting the car bomb that killed Sekou Bah and two other civilians (for which Sekou was framed). Belli eventually goes rogue and ambushes Quinn and Astrid at a lakeside cabin, killing Astrid. Quinn confronts Dar Adal, who learns that Belli was sent by a splinter faction within the black ops group. Quinn tracks Belli to a house used to plan black ops missions and watches the house from nearby. Belli ambushes Carrie when she investigates the house, but Quinn intervenes and brutally murders Belli as revenge for Astrid's death. He later finds evidence that Belli's black ops team, led by General McClendon, is planning to assassinate President-elect Keane.

Farhad Nafisi
Played by Bernard White, Farhad Nafisi is an Iranian banker who secretly worked as a Mossad asset. Saul interrogates him to learn about Iran's possible underground nuclear program, unaware that it was a ruse orchestrated by Mossad (alongside Dar Adal) to manipulate President-elect Keane's military policy. Majid Javadi eventually finds and tortures Nafisi into admitting that Iran has no underground program. Nafisi is later eliminated by Mossad.

Dorit
Played by Jacqueline Antaramian, Dorit is the sister of Saul Berenson. She currently resides in the West Bank, Israel. Dorit and Saul grew up in Indiana, United States. Being one of the eight Jewish families in the entire town, their parents tried not to offend anyone with their Jewishness by asking them to exchange Christmas gifts with neighbors. After she met Moshe, she changed and feel proud as a Jew. They later move to West Bank. Moshe chose the place for their house, just beside the valley so that they can see the Arabs every day.

Agent Thoms
Played by James Mount, Agent Thoms is a CIA agent.

Christine Lonas
Played by Marin Hinkle, Christine Lonas is a social worker dispatched by child services to take custody of Carrie's daughter Frannie following a hostage situation at Carrie's home involving Quinn. Christine is later revealed to have received a tip regarding Frannie's safety from Dar Adal. Carrie negotiates with Christine to reclaim custody of Frannie. Christine later testifies at a custody hearing between Carrie and her sister Maggie regarding who should take care of Frannie.

Nate Joseph 
Played by Seth Numrich as Nate Joseph

Sharon Aldright
Played by Lesli Margherita. Sharon Aldright is a follower and the girlfriend of Brett O'Keefe. Following President Keane's crackdown on anyone associated with the government after a failed assassination attempt, O'Keefe and Aldright go on the run, although they continue to transmit videos to the former's followers. O'Keefe and Sharon are taken to a safe house where he continues broadcasting and he meets a group of supporters who hang on his every word. O'Keefe finds refuge in a furniture store where he can continue his podcasts. Upon leaving the store late at night, the police catch up to him but rather than arresting him they tell him that they can take him somewhere safe. After they end up taking refuge with some followers, they are tracked down by the FBI and Saul Berenson, newly appointed National Security Advisor to the Keane administration. Attempts to convince O'Keefe to come quietly fail so Aldright decides to co-operate and turns herself in.

David Thornton
Played by David Thornton as George Pallis

Sam Paley
Played by Dylan Baker, Sam Paley is a United States senator leading an investigation into President Keane after her arrest of 200 federal employees. He initially works with Carrie to obtain insider information that will help his investigation. After the assassination of General Jamie McClendon, Paley subpoenas Simone Martin, girlfriend of chief of staff David Wellington, to testify before Congress. Carrie soon learns that her source, FBI agent Dante Allen, is a Russian asset (alongside Simone), working to sabotage the Keane administration by implicating Wellington in the McClendon assassination. Saul and Wellington disclose their findings on the Russian infiltration plot to a stunned Paley, who initially believes them, only to reverse course after Dante's death, believing Keane is using Russia as a scapegoat to cover up her own crimes. Paley begins amassing votes among Keane's staff to invoke the 25th Amendment to remove her from office. When Paley learns that Saul is on a mission to extract Simone from Russia, he allows his chief of staff to notify the Russian ambassador to sabotage the mission, thereby ending Keane's hopes of salvaging her administration. After Simone is successfully exfiltrated and testifies regarding the GRU's plot to bring down Keane, Paley is arrested as a co-conspirator for his attempts to stop the exfiltration.

Bill Dunn
Played by Mackenzie Astin, Bill Dunn is Maggie Mathison's husband and Carrie's brother-in-law. An employee of the Keane administration, Bill frequently clashes with Carrie, who he increasingly views as a nuisance in his household. Bill and Maggie eventually take custody of Carrie's daughter Frannie.

Simone Martin
Played by Sandrine Holt, Simone Martin is a captain in the GRU, Russia's intelligence agency, and a key player in their plot to sabotage the Keane administration. Simone makes a series of money transactions that enable the assassination of General Jamie McClendon in federal prison, and later attempts to testify in Congress implicating White House Chief of Staff David Wellington, her occasional lover, as the orchestrator. When Carrie and Saul learn of Simone's role in the Russians' subterfuge, they attempt to recover her from witness protection, but she is extracted by GRU operatives led by Yevgeny Gromov, her actual lover. Yevgeny sends Simone back to Russia, but Saul and Carrie manage to exfiltrate her back to the U.S. to testify about her role in the conspiracy.

Thomas Anson
Played by James D'Arcy, Thomas Anson is a former CIA field operative who worked with Carrie during her tenure as Kabul station chief. Anson and Carrie had an affair which led to the dissolution of his relationship, though the two remain friends. Carrie recruits Anson alongside a team of other former colleagues from the Middle East in a mission to uncover a Russian conspiracy to undermine President Keane's administration. Anson leads both efforts to track down Simone Martin (in Washington D.C. and later Russia), as well as helping find evidence of Dante Allen's role in the conspiracy. Carrie also has Anson steal files from Maggie Mathison's clinic attesting to her theft of psychiatric medication for Carrie, which Carrie plans to use as leverage in her custody battle with her sister regarding the care of her daughter Frannie. However, Carrie ultimately decides against it.

Sandy Langmore
Played by Catherine Curtin, Sandy Langmore is a former CIA officer who was demoted to teaching at the academy after the leaked documents scandal in Berlin. Saul recruits Sandy, an expert on Russia, to his covert task force investigating a Russian conspiracy to sabotage the Keane administration.

Clint Prower
Played by Peter Vack, Clint Prower is a young but capable analyst from DARPA that Saul recruits to his task force to investigate Russian interference in the Keane administration. Clint is soon found and threatened by Senator Paley's chief of staff into disclosing that Saul is on a mission to exfiltrate Simone Martin from Russia.

Ralph Warner
Played by Beau Bridges, Ralph Warner is the Vice President of the United States under President Elizabeth Keane, and later inherits the presidency following Keane's resignation. Only months into his tenure, Warner dies in a helicopter crash alongside Afghan President Daoud while returning from a combat outpost in Afghanistan where he announced the end of the war. The presidents' death becomes the focal point of a protracted standoff between the United States and Pakistan, until it is later revealed through the helicopter's flight recorder that the crash simply occurred due to a mechanical failure.

Viktor Makarov
Played by Elya Baskin, Victor Makarov is Russia's ambassador to the United States. Saul negotiates with Viktor for Carrie's release after her detainment during the mission to exfiltrate Simone Martin. Saul later attempts to bargain with Viktor again for the flight recorder on President Warner's helicopter.

Sergei Mirov
Played by Merab Ninidze, Sergei Mirov is the head of the GRU and Yevgeny Gromov's superior. He is present at a diplomatic meeting between U.S. and Russian officials, which unbeknownst to him is a ruse to lure Yevgeny away from Simone Martin so that she can be extracted. Later, Mirov keeps custody of the flight recorder on President Warner's helicopter, sending Yevgeny to bargain for the identity of Saul's deeply-embedded asset in the Kremlin in exchange for the recorder. Mirov learns that his interpreter, Anna Pomerantseva, is in fact Saul's asset, and orders her eliminated. He then upholds Russia's end of the deal by announcing at a United Nations summit that the helicopter crash that killed Presidents Warner and Daoud was due to mechanical failure.

Abdul Qadir G'ulom
Played by Mohammad Bakri, General Abdul Qadir G'ulom is the Vice President (and later President) of Afghanistan. Known to be an aggressive, strongman leader, G'ulom's first act as president is to publicly blame Haissam Haqqani for the deaths of Presidents Warner and Daoud, then round up hundreds of Taliban prisoners in a stadium and threaten their execution unless Haqqani turns himself in. He persuades the inexperienced new U.S. President Benjamin Hayes into siding with his course of action. Once Haqqani turns himself in to American authorities, G'ulom arranges for a speedy trial in which Haqqani is sentenced to death, then executed by a firing squad.

Jenna Bragg
Played by Andrea Deck, Jenna Bragg is a young, novice CIA agent stationed in Kabul. Station chief Mike Dunne has her shadow Carrie, who he suspects of being a Russian asset. Jenna forms a bond with Carrie during her tenure in Kabul despite her suspicions about Carrie's allegiance.

While searching for the flight recorder from President Warner's helicopter, Carrie has Jenna disclose the location of a safehouse used by CIA operatives hunting Carrie and Yevgeny Gromov, lying to Jenna that she plans to turn herself in. She instead has Yevgeny arrange the operatives' arrest. Jenna, feeling betrayed, nonetheless implores Carrie not to disclose her aiding and abetting of Carrie's evasion of the CIA. When the American and Pakistani governments negotiate the operatives' release, Jenna travels to the Pakistan border to greet the soldiers. However, Jalal Haqqani sends one of his lieutenants to carry out a suicide bombing at the border, killing all the prisoners and injuring Jenna. Jenna returns to the U.S. to testify against Carrie in an FBI investigation, but relents and instead agrees to help Carrie track down Saul's Russian asset (whose identity the Russians are willing to trade for the flight recorder). After procuring a crucial lead for Carrie, Jenna decides to quit the CIA, disillusioned with the job for what it demands of her.

Mike Dunne
Played by Cliff Chamberlain, Mike Dunne is the CIA's station chief in Kabul during peace talks between the U.S. and Afghanistan. He is deeply suspicious of Carrie, who he believes may have been turned by the Russians. His suspicions are seemingly corroborated when Carrie lies about the contents of a discussion she had with Yevgeny Gromov out of the CIA's listening range. Carrie later turns herself in at the Kabul station, and Mike has her detained to an interrogation room before handing off the investigation to the FBI.

Jalal Haqqani
Played by Elham Ehsas, Jalal Haqqani is the last living son of Haissam Haqqani. Surrounded by war during his upbringing, Jalal is a firm believer in the Taliban's cause, and staunchly opposes his father's plans to broker peace with the U.S. After his father exiles him for conspiring with the ISI, Jalal is found and nursed back to health by ISI director-general Tasneem Qureishi. When the elder Haqqani is wrongly sentenced to death for causing the helicopter crash that killed Presidents Warner and Daoud, Jalal takes Max Piotrowski as a hostage to negotiate his father's release. When his father is executed, Haqqani kills Max and takes control of the Taliban himself, falsely claiming credit for bringing down the helicopters and using his inflated credibility to significantly bolster the ranks of the Taliban. Tasneem attempts to persuade Jalal to go into hiding, but reverses course and decides to protect him after witnessing how large the Taliban has grown under his leadership. Jalal frequently clashes with Balach, one of his father's trusted lieutenants who advised him regarding peace in the region. He eventually punishes Balach by forcing him to carry out a suicide bombing at the Afghanistan-Pakistan border where a number of CIA operatives are being released from custody.

Balach
Played by Seear Kohi, Balach is one of Haissam Haqqani's most trusted lieutenants, and plays a key role in convincing him to seek an end to the war in Afghanistan. After Haqqani is executed by Afghan authorities, his son Jalal takes over the Taliban. The younger Haqqani's warmongering ways frequently put him at odds with Balach, who begrudgingly follows Balach's orders. Jalal eventually forces Balach to carry out a suicide attack on the Americans, threatening to murder his family if he does not comply. Balach reluctantly drives to the Afghanistan-Pakistan border where a number of CIA operatives are being released from custody, and detonates a bomb rigged to his car, killing all the operatives as well as himself.

Vanessa Kroll
Played by Karen Pittman, Vanessa Kroll is an FBI agent leading the task force investigating the death of President Warner. She arrives with a team in Kabul to survey the CIA station, and places Carrie under arrest when she turns herself in but refuses to cooperate with the investigation.

Benjamin Hayes
Played by Sam Trammell, Benjamin Hayes is the Vice President of the United States under Ralph Warner, having been selected from the opposing party in a show of bipartisanship. Hayes inherits the presidency following Warner's death in a helicopter crash. Impulsive and inexperienced, Hayes frequently makes decisions based on what would earn him the most political capital, which allows him to be easily manipulated.

When Afghan President Abdul Qadir G'ulom rounds up hundreds of Taliban prisoners in an attempt to draw out Haissam Haqqani, White House Chief of Staff David Wellington advises Hayes to talk down G'ulom. However, G'ulom manipulates the inexperienced Hayes into siding with his aggressive course of action. Hayes then hires John Zabel as his advisor on Afghanistan, but Zabel, eager to send the U.S. into another war in the Middle East, uses a leaked video of Jalal Haqqani claiming responsibility for President Warner's death to persuade Hayes into antagonizing Pakistan. The two countries reach the brink of war until it is proven that the President's helicopter crashed due to mechanical failure, forcing Hayes to stand down.

John Zabel
Played by Hugh Dancy, John Zabel is President Hayes' foreign policy advisor on Afghanistan, brought in following the death of President Warner. Despite his lack of experience in the military, Zabel is a brash and ardent advocate for war, and works to manipulate Hayes into escalating tensions with the Pakistan government in hopes of launching an invasion in the area. His plans are eventually thwarted when it is revealed that Warner's helicopter crashed due to a mechanical failure rather than an attack by the Taliban.

Guest characters
The following is a list of guest characters who have appeared in one or two episodes of a season. The characters are listed in the order they were first credited in the series.

Prince Farid Bin Abbud
Played by Amir Arison, Prince Farid Bin Abbud is a Saudi Arabian prince who Lynne Reed was a consort for. He was seen talking to Abu Nazir and was thought to be connected to his terrorist network.

Afsal Hamid
Played by Waleed Zuaiter, Asfal "Affie" Hamid was an al-Qaeda fighter who was the sole survivor of the compound Brody was rescued from. He was Brody's guard during his captivity and frequently tortured and humiliated him. After Hamid is detained, Brody requests a face-to-face, during which Hamid provokes Brody into physically attacking him. Hamid later commits suicide in his cell using a razor blade, which Carrie suspects was slipped to him by Brody during their scuffle.

Issa Nazir
Played by Rohan Chand, Issa Nazir was Abu Nazir's young son, to whom Brody was assigned the job of teaching English. Brody came to develop a fatherly love for Issa, and later witnessed Issa's death in a drone strike ordered by V.P. Walden. Brody swore revenge on Walden for Issa's death and plotted to kill him a suicide attack upon return from his captivity.

Xander
Played by Taylor Kowalski, Xander is the former boyfriend of Dana whom she broke up with when she met Finn Walden.

Lynne Reed
Played by Brianna Brown, Lynne Reed works as a consort to Farid bin Abbud, a Saudi Arabian prince. Reed also is a CIA informant recruited by Carrie Mathison.  She observes Farid meeting with Abu Nazir and reports it to Carrie, leading to a CIA investigation. Reed is eventually killed by an associate of Latif bin Walid (the prince's chief aide), who is involved in an al-Qaeda plot independent of the prince.

Larry
Played by James Urbaniak, Larry is the longtime administrator of the CIA's polygraph tests at their Langley headquarters.

Mansour Al-Zahrani
Played by Ramsey Faragallah, Mansour Al-Zahrani is a Saudi diplomat stationed in Washington D.C.  He is also secretly affiliated with al-Qaeda and acts as a handler to Nicholas Brody and Tom Walker. He is discovered by the CIA and then killed in a bombing attack engineered by Tom Walker.

Elizabeth Gaines
Played by Linda Purl, Elizabeth Gaines is Chief of Staff to Vice President William Walden and his most trusted advisor. She leads the effort to groom Brody into entering U.S. politics. She is assassinated by Tom Walker during the attack on the State Department.

Bassel
Played by Nasser Faris, Bassel is an Al-Qaeda bombmaker operating out of a clothing store in Gettysburg. He tailors the suicide vest worn by Brody in his planned attack on the Vice President. After the Gettysburg location is burned, Brody is sent by Abu Nazir's people to extract Bassel, but a paranoid Bassel attempts to escape, only to be killed by Brody in the ensuing struggle.

Fatima Ali
Played by Clara Khoury, Fatima Ali is the wife of Hezbollah district commander Abbas Ali, and a former asset of Carrie Mathison.  She approaches the CIA with new information but is only willing to speak to Carrie, forcing the CIA to summon Carrie back into action.

El Niño
Played by Manny Pérez, El Niño is the leader of a band of Venezuelan mercenaries who capture Brody after he is shot by Colombians crossing the border. El Niño and his men take him to the Tower of David, an aborted housing project in Caracas, where Brody is nursed back to health and given heroin to make him dependent on El Niño's men, forcing him to stay with them. He has a daughter named Esme (played by Martina Garcia) who accompanies Brody on an attempt to escape the tower.

Dr. Graham
Played by Erik Dellums, Dr. Graham is a resident of the Tower of David who treats Brody's gunshot wound and begins supplying him with heroin. He is implied to be a pedophile who lives in the slum due to social ostracism.

Leland Bennett
Played by Martin Donovan, Leland Bennett is a partner in a Washington, D.C. law firm who represents a bank that has ties to Iranian terrorists. Bennett attempts to convince Carrie to inform on the CIA for a client of his (who turns out to be Majid Javadi), which she agrees to in order to lure Javadi out.

Hafez Azizi
Played by Donnie Keshawarz, Hafez Azizi is the leader of a special operations team (US Army Special Forces) recruited by Saul to train Brody back to health and accompany him on his mission to kill Danesh Akbari in Tehran. He loses his leg in an IED explosion that hits his and Brody's car; Brody rescues him from the wreckage.

Yousef Turani
Played by Jared Ward, "Yousef Turani" is the doctor for a special operations team (US Army Special Forces) recruited by Saul to perform the drug detox procedure on Brody. Dar Adal tells Saul to use ibogaine while Turani warns of the side effects. Turani and Brody are playing taule (Arabic backgammon) as they talk about Carrie. In this dialogue, Turani realized that Brody really loves Carrie. Later, Turani and his team assist Brody on his mission to Iran. After Saul orders him to abort the mission, Brody decides to continue and Turani helps. Turani is shot in the head by Majid Javadi.

Josh Modares
Played by Walid Amini, Josh Modares is in the car when Carrie decides to take Brody to see her daughter, Dana Brody. He is one of the members of the US Army Special Forces unit that trains and assists Brody on his journey into Iran.

Eric Baraz
Played by Jaylen Moore, Eric Baraz is among a team of US Army Special Forces soldiers assigned to train and assist Brody on his mission to Iran. They later bring him to Iraq's Kurdish regional government region near the Iran-Iraq border, and when approached by Kurdish police, they open fire when his cover story is not believed. In Season 8 (Catch and Release), Braz participates as one of Saul's bodyguards.

Danesh Akbari
Played by Houshang Touzie, General Danesh Akbari is the Intelligence Chief of Iran who Brody is sent to Tehran to kill. When the two meet in private, Akbari informs Brody that he and Abu Nazir discussed the latter's plans to turn Brody against his own country during the early days of Brody's capture. Brody reveals to Akbari that he was sent by the CIA to kill Akbari and replace him with Javadi; a stunned Akbari thanks Brody for telling him the truth, only for Brody to then bludgeon him with an ashtray and smother him to death with a pillow. Soon after, Brody is sentenced to death and hanged for his murder of Akbari, while Javadi inherits leadership of the IRGC.

Sandy Bachman
Played by Corey Stoll, Sandy Bachman is the CIA's station chief in Islamabad. He is responsible for sharing valuable intelligence that allows the CIA station in Kabul (led by Carrie) to target key sites belonging to Taliban leader Haissam Haqqani. Sandy, who is covertly trading state secrets for his information, leaves the station unprotected to meet with his classified source (later revealed to be Dennis Boyd). However, his photo is leaked to the Pakistani press, who identify him as the man responsible for a drone strike on a wedding that killed numerous civilians. Carrie and Quinn attempt to get Sandy off the streets, but a violent mob surrounds their vehicle and beats Sandy to death. Quinn later finds evidence that Sandy's murder was coordinated by the ISI.

Eden
Played by Emily Walker, Eden is Peter Quinn's landlady with whom he has a brief sexual relationship prior to his return to Islamabad. Quinn is arrested when he attacks two men in a bar for insulting Eden.

Ellen Mathison
Played by Victoria Clark, Ellen Mathison is the estranged mother of Carrie and Maggie Mathison. After the death of Frank Mathison, the girls' father, Maggie invites Ellen home to mourn her ex-husband, but Carrie rebuffs her mother and has her leave. Carrie later tracks down Ellen in Nebraska (where she works as a schoolteacher) and demands to know why she abandoned her family. Ellen admits that it was her serial adultery, not Frank's bipolar disorder, that made her leave, and reassures Carrie that her condition does not prevent her from sustaining a healthy relationship.

Tim
Played by Callan McAuliffe, Tim is the son of Ellen Mathison, the younger half-brother of Maggie Mathison and Carrie Mathison and the uncle of Ruby Dunn, Josie Dunn and Franny Mathison. He is briefly mentioned and seen in Season 4, when he is trying to contact Carrie.

Joe Crocker
Played by John Getz, Joe Crocker is the United States Secretary of State to President Morse. It looks like Long Time Coming is the Season 4 Season Finale of Homeland to deal with Saul's candidacy for CIA Director. In season 5, in "Separation Anxiety" at the CIA meeting on the Syria situation. Joe Crocker has a tense conversation with Quinn who has returned to the United States after 28 months in war-torn Al-Raqqah and the other CIA directors with Dar Adal and Saul. Already in season 6, he appears in America First.

General Youssef
Played by Yigal Naor, General Youssef is a Syrian military official who Saul convinces to take over the Syrian presidency after a planned CIA coup against Bashar al-Assad. However, Youssef is killed on his way out of Germany in an airplane explosion engineered by the Russians.

Tova Rivlin
Played by Hadar Ratzon-Rotem, Tova Rivlin is a Mossad agent. In Berlin, she and Etai Luskin help Saul fake his defection to Israel to protect him from being apprehended on false pretenses by the CIA. She and Dar Adal later conspire to mislead Saul (and by extension, President-elect Keane) that Iran is running a parallel nuclear program with North Korea.

President Morse
Played by Alan Dale, President Morse is Elizabeth Keane's predecessor.

Clarice
Played by Mickey O'Hagan, Clarice is a prostitute that Quinn befriends while recovering from his stroke in New York. She later takes Carrie to meet Quinn at his stakeout of the house used by Dar Adal's black ops team. Mickey O'Hagan followed that with a recurring role on Showtime's Homeland (2016) as Clarice, a sneaky, not very bright bad girl, and sneaky confidant to Quinn's (Rupert Friend).

Dorit
Played by Jacqueline Antaramian, Dorit is Saul Berenson's sister and an Israeli settler in the West Bank. Though she and Saul are largely estranged, Dorit still cares deeply about her brother. Saul visits Dorit after 12 years as cover to meet with the Iranians. Carrie later visits her, lying to her that Saul has died as a ruse to receive Saul's "legacy plan" to pass on the identity of his Russian asset to Carrie. Indeed, Dorit has a USB given to her by Saul, which contains a video message from him disclosing the asset's identity to Carrie. Dorit travels to the U.S. after giving Carrie the USB, believing her brother to have died. The two reconnect over the next two years, and she helps Saul move out of his residence in Washington D.C.

Samira Noori
Played by Sitara Attaie, Samira Noori is a resident of Kabul whose husband was killed in a car bomb intended for her after she campaigned against General G'ulom's regime. Carrie finds Samira's collection of evidence attesting to G'ulom's embezzlement of government funds, and uses it to leverage G'ulom into supporting peace talks between the U.S. and Afghanistan. Carrie later rescues Samira from being kidnapped by her brother-in-law, who attempts to forcibly marry her after the death of her husband.

Anna Pomerantseva
Played by Tatyana Mukha, Anna Pomerantseva is the head interpreter for the GRU, and Saul's longtime asset inside the Kremlin. A former English teacher in East Berlin, Anna volunteered to become Saul's spy in 1986 after her entire cadet class was executed because their classmate, Andrei Kuznetsov, defected to the U.S. with Saul's aid. She spends over two decades passing state secrets to Saul while rising the ranks of the Kremlin, using handwritten messages hidden inside the bindings of red leather books to communicate with Saul under an alias. Carrie is eventually forced to give Anna's identity to the Russians in exchange for the flight recorder that proves that President Warner's helicopter crashed due to a mechanical failure, which would avert a war between the U.S. and Pakistan. Saul calls Anna to warn her that the Russians have her identity, but she kills herself to avoid being captured. Two years later, Carrie takes over Anna's role as Saul's mole inside the Kremlin, using Anna's same tradecraft to pass vital information to Saul. Julie Engelbrecht plays a young Anna in flashbacks.

References

Homeland
Characters
 

fr:Homeland (série télévisée)#Distribution